The 2003–04 USHL season is the 25th season of the United States Hockey League as an all-junior league. The regular season began on September 26, 2003, and concluded on March 28, 2004, with the regular season champion winning the Anderson Cup. The 2003–04 season was the first for the Danville Wings after transferring from the North American Hockey League and the only season for the St. Louis Heartland Eagles after moving from Topeka, Kansas. At the conclusion of the season, St. Louis voluntarily suspended operations and officially folded a year later.

The Clark Cup playoffs features the top four teams from each division competing for the league title.

Regular season
Final standings

Note: GP = Games played; W = Wins; L = Losses; OTL = Overtime losses; SL = Shootout losses; GF = Goals for; GA = Goals against; PTS = Points; x = clinched playoff berth; y = clinched division title; z = clinched league title

East Division

West Division

Clark Cup playoffs

Players

Scoring leaders

Leading goaltenders

Awards
Coach of the Year: Wil Nichol Chicago Steel
Curt Hammer Award: Topher Scott Chicago Steel
Defenseman of the Year: Mike Hodgson Sioux City Musketeers
Forward of the Year: Mike Howe River City Lancers
General Manager of the Year: Bliss Litter Tri-City Storm
Goaltender of the Year: Phil Lamoureux Lincoln Stars
Organization of the Year: Tri-City Storm
Player of the Year: Mike Howe River City Lancers
Rookie of the Year: Matthew Ford Sioux Falls Stampede

References

External links
 Official website of the United States Hockey League
2003-04 USHL Season (Hockey DB)
2003-04 USHL Season (Elite Prospects)

USHL
United States Hockey League seasons